Giuseppe Caruso may refer to:
	
 Pino Caruso (1934–2019), Italian actor, author and TV-personality
 Pippo Caruso (1935–2018), Italian composer, conductor and music arranger
 Giuseppe Caruso (brigand) (1820–1892), Italian brigand